Salmonivirus is a genus of viruses in the order Herpesvirales, in the family Alloherpesviridae. Salmonidae serve as natural hosts. There are three species in this genus. Diseases associated with this genus include: salHV-3: epizootic epitheliotropic disease.

Species 
The genus consists of the following three species:

 Salmonid herpesvirus 1
 Salmonid herpesvirus 2
 Salmonid herpesvirus 3

Structure
Viruses in Salmonivirus are enveloped, with icosahedral and spherical to pleomorphic geometries, and T=16 symmetry. The diameter is around 150-200 nm. Genomes are linear and non-segmented.

Life cycle 
Viral replication is nuclear, and is lysogenic. Entry into the host cell is achieved by attachment of the viral glycoproteins to host receptors, which mediates endocytosis. DNA-templated transcription is the method of transcription. Salmonidae serve as the natural host. Transmission routes are passive diffusion.

References

External links 

 Viralzone: Salmonivirus
 ICTV

Alloherpesviridae
Virus genera